Bashir Ahmad, (born October 12, 1982) is a Pakistani-American professional mixed martial artist who is known as the "God-father of Mixed Martial Arts Pakistan". He is famous for being the pioneer of mixed martial arts in Pakistan. He is currently signed with ONE Championship.

Background 
Bashir Ahmad was born in the city of Faisalabad in Punjab, Pakistan, but moved to Great Falls, Virginia, United States, with his parents when he was three years old. In 2002, he pursued a career in the U.S. military, joining the Virginia National Guard. In 2004, he was deployed to Iraq when the war broke out. He was stationed in Mosul, working as a U.S. Army medic in a team that disarmed explosives. Ahmad started training in Brazilian jiu-jitsu around 2005, when the boom of MMA was taking place in North America.

He came to Lahore, Pakistan in 2007 with the aim of promoting MMA in his native country. After training local kids jiu jitsu for some time, he went to Thailand for a year to train in Muay Thai. On his return to Pakistan in 2009, he set up a small MMA training gym in his own apartment. The apartment was so filthy that he named it 'The Slaughterhouse'.

In 2012, Ahmad opened a proper gym named "Synergy MMA Academy" in Lahore which has grown to become one of the biggest gyms in the country.

PAK MMA 
Bashir Ahmad laid the foundations of Mixed Martial Arts Pakistan with his arrival in Pakistan in 2007. The purpose of Mixed Martial Arts Pakistan was to promote all martial arts and combat sports in the country while mainly focusing on MMA. Working on his purpose, he went around whole country organizing seminars mostly for BJJ and MMA and helped in conducting the very first MMA fighting events.

ONE Championship career 
Bashir Ahmad was the first Pakistani to compete in MMA at an international level when he made his debut in ONE Championship by fighting Shannon Wiratchai at ONE FC: Kings and Champions on April 5, 2013. Ahmad got a cut in the first round but doctors let the fight continue and Ahmad won his promotional debut via unanimous decision. 

At ONE FC: Champions and Warriors, he lost to Brazilian jiu-jitsu black belt Bruno Pucci by submission via rear-naked choke. 

He fought Tanaphong Khunhankaew at ONE FC: Roar of the Tigers and won by submitting him with a rear-naked choke.

In ONE Championship: Valor of Champions, Bashir Ahmad stepped in to fight Amir Khan Ansari on a 3-day notice when Shannon Wiratchai, Khan's original opponent, was injured. Bashir Ahmad lost that fight by TKO via doctor's stoppage. 

Bashir Ahmad was scheduled to fight Martin Nguyen at ONE Championship: Odyssey of Champions but the fight was cancelled when Jadamba Narantungalag couldn't appear to fight for the main title match and Martin Nguyen took his place.

Bashir Ahmad submitted his Egyptian opponent Mahmoud Mohamed in 83 seconds at ONE Championship: State of Warriors 

Bashir Ahmad currently works as an executive in competition and matchmaking for One Championship.

Shaheen Academy 
Bashir Ahmad is an active advocate for using martial arts philosophy as a means for the betterment of at-risk youth. In 2015, he founded Shaheen Academy, a non-profit MMA gym and tutoring centre in Lahore, Pakistan. Shaheen is located in the middle of a large slum, Charrar Pind, and its aim is to use martial arts as a vehicle for building confidence, discipline and self-improvemnent in the youth of the slum. It provides free martial arts training and after-school tutoring for children. Bashir Ahmad holds an annual fundraiser for Shaheen and the academy runs entirely on donations.

Mixed martial arts record 

|-
|Win
|align=center| 4–3
|Mahmoud Mohamed
|Submission (heel hook)
|ONE Championship: State of Warriors
|
|align=center| 1
|align=center| 1:23
|Yangon, Myanmar
| 
|-
|Loss
|align=center| 3–3
|Jimmy Yabo 
|KO (Punch)
|ONE Championship: Tribe of Warriors
|
|align=center| 1
|align=center| 0:21
|Jakarta, Indonesia
|Catchweight !58 lb) bout.
|-
|Loss
|align=center| 3–2
|Amir Khan Ansari
|TKO (Doctor's Stoppage)
|ONE Championship: Valor of Champions
|
|align=center| 3
|align=center| 3:20
|Pasay, Philippines
|Catchwheight (150 lb) bout.
|-
|Win
|align=center| 3–1
|Tanaphong Khunhankaew
|Submission (rear-naked choke)
|ONE Fighting Championship: Roar of Tigers
|
|align=center| 1
|align=center| 4:38
|Kuala Lumpur, Malaysia
| 
|-
|Loss
|align=center| 2–1
|Bruno Pucci
|Submission (rear-naked choke)
|ONE Fighting Championship: Champions & Warriors
|
|align=center| 1
|align=center| 3:13
|Jakarta, Indonesia
| 
|-
|Win
|align=center| 2–0
|Shannon Wiratchai
|Decision (Unanimous)
|ONE Fighting Championship: Kings and Champions
|
|align=center| 3
|align=center| 5:00
|Kallang, Singapore
| 
|-
|Win
|align=center| 1–0
|Mohammad Arshad
|Submission (rear-naked choke)
|Pak Fight Club – PFC 2
|
|align=center|1
|align=center|0:26
|Lahore, Pakistan
|

References 

1982 births
American male mixed martial artists
American emigrants to Pakistan
American expatriate sportspeople in Thailand
American Muay Thai practitioners
American practitioners of Brazilian jiu-jitsu
American people of Punjabi descent
Living people
Pakistani emigrants to the United States
Pakistani male mixed martial artists
Pakistani Muay Thai practitioners
Pakistani practitioners of Brazilian jiu-jitsu
Mixed martial artists from Virginia
United States Army soldiers
Martial artists from Punjab, Pakistan
People from Great Falls, Virginia
United States Army personnel of the Iraq War
Virginia National Guard personnel
Mixed martial artists utilizing Muay Thai
Mixed martial artists utilizing Brazilian jiu-jitsu